Ensenada is a census-designated place (CDP) in Rio Arriba County, New Mexico, United States. The population was 107 at the 2010 census. It had a post office from 1906 to 1958.

Geography

Demographics

As of the census of 2010, there were 107 people, 42 households, and 30 families residing in the CDP. The population density was 73.3 people per square mile (28.3/km). There were 54 housing units at an average density of 37.0 per square mile (14.3/km). The racial makeup of the CDP was 72.0% White, 0% African American, 2.8% Native American, 0% Asian, 21.5% from other races, and 3.7% from two or more races. Hispanic or Latino of any race were 88.8% of the population.

There were 42 households, out of which 33.3% had children under the age of 18 living with them, 45.2% were married couples living together, 16.7% had a female householder with no husband present, and 28.6% were non-families. 26.2% of all households were made up of individuals, and 9.5% had someone living alone who was 65 years of age or older. The average household size was 2.55 and the average family size was 2.97.

Climate
This climatic region is typified by large seasonal temperature differences, with warm to hot (and often humid) summers and cold (sometimes severely cold) winters.  According to the Köppen Climate Classification system, Ensenada has a humid continental climate, abbreviated "Dfb" on climate maps.

Education
It is within the Chama Valley Independent Schools school district.

References

Census-designated places in Rio Arriba County, New Mexico
Census-designated places in New Mexico